Medina was launched in 1811 and quickly became a West Indiaman. Ten years later she started sailing to the East Indies under a license from the British East India Company (EIC). She made two voyages transporting convicts to Australia, first to Sydney and then to Hobart. She also brought immigrants to the Swan River Colony. On that voyage she sustained damage that caused her to be condemned in July 1831.

Career
Medina first appeared in Lloyd's Register (LR) in 1811 with Kenneday, master, Davy & Co., owners, and trade Exmouth–London. She then became a West Indiaman.

A gale on 20 October 1820 at Deal drove Medina, Kennedy, master, causing her to lose an anchor. She rode out the gale with one anchor.

In 1813 the EIC had lost its monopoly on the trade between India and Britain. British ships were then free to sail to India or the Indian Ocean under a license from the EIC.

On 18 November 1821, Medina, Mattison, master, sailed from Gravesend, bound for Bombay. On 16 December she put in as Plymouth leaky in her upper works, having to be caulked. She had reached as far as longitude 8°, but had to put back because of strong, adverse gales.  A few days later she had to be moved up the Catwater to be moored for the necessary repairs. On 26 December she was still at Plymouth, repairing. A report dated Plymouth, 15 January 1822, had almost completed her repairs and was expected to sail shortly for Bombay.

On 25 January 1822 Medina, Mattison, master, sailed for Bombay, sailing under a license from the EIC. She arrived at Bombay on 7 June. On 25 October Medina, Owens, master (late Mattison), was at the Cape of Good Hope. She sailed on 2 November for Liverpool. She arrived at Liverpool on 3 March 1823 with Brown, master, after having stopped at Milford to effect some repairs.

1st convict voyage (1823): 
Captain Robert Brown sailed from Cork on 5 September 1823 and arrived at Sydney on 23 December. She had embarked 177 convicts and she landed 176.

2nd convict voyage (1825): 
Captain John Briggs sailed from the Downs on 26 April 1825 and arrived at Hobart on 14 September. She had embarked 180 male convicts and disembarked 178, having suffered two convict deaths en route. She arrived at Bengal from New South Wales on 25 January 1826. On 9 March she sailed from Bengal for London but had to put back four days later. She had grounded on the James and Mary Sand and was unloading on the 24th prior to being surveyed. She sailed from Bengal on 25 June. She then sailed from St Helena on 28 September, having come via Mauritius where she had stopped between 7 and 13 August. She arrived at Gravesend on 12 December.

Fate
On January 1830 Captain W. Pace sailed for Medina for the Swan River. She arrived on 6 July. She was carrying 16 cabin passengers, 34 steerage passengers, and 27 crew. She lost her anchors on 19 July and Captain Pace made for Britannia Roads. On the way she grounded on the Parmelia Reef.

Captain Pace had planned to sail on 30 August for Batavia, but had to delay his departure to 30 September due to damage to Medinas keel. At Batavia Medina underwent repairs that cost more than she was worth. from there she sailed to Manila. She then sailed from Manila.

Lloyd's List reported on 25 November 1831 Medina had put into Sourabaya in distress. It reported on 16 December 1831 that Medina had been condemned there in July as unseaworthy, and sold for breaking up.

Citations and references
Citations

References
 
 
 

1811 ships
Age of Sail merchant ships of England
Convict ships to New South Wales
Convict ships to Tasmania
Migrant ships to Australia
Maritime incidents in 1831